Kripa Shankar Sharma was a Hindi poet from Morena, Madhya Pradesh.

Biography
Kripa Shanka Sharma was born in Harduaganj, Aligarh, Uttar Pradesh. 

He spent 6 months in jail for 1942's non-cooperation movement headed by Mahatma Gandhi. He wrote a letter to Pt. Jawahar Lal Nehru

His grandfather Pt. Nathuram Shankar Sharma'Shankar' and father Hari Shankar Sharma were famous Hindi poets, and his daughter Indira Indu was also a well-known poet. His younger brother Vidhay Shankar Sharma was editor of Sainik (Agra) and Amar Ujala (Agra).

Print media work
He was editor of Nirala.

Poetic work
His poetic works include: Murlika, Jar Ram-Rajya aa jayega, Bapu ke geet, Jadgamba, Kalyugi & Har hindu hindustani hai, and Sondhi Sughand.

Books
Hindi Sahitya Parichya
Hindi Sahitya Ka Itihas
Din Ke Sapney
Bikhari Kiraney, an essay collection

References

Year of birth missing
Year of death missing
People from Aligarh
People from Morena
Hindi-language poets
Indian independence activists from Madhya Pradesh
Prisoners and detainees of British India
Indian editors
Hindi-language writers